Potassium-chloride transporter, member 4 is a chloride potassium symporter protein. It is encoded by the gene SLC12A4.

See also
 Solute carrier family

References

Further reading

Solute carrier family